The Christian Chronicle is a religious newspaper associated with the Churches of Christ.  The Chronicle has a "news not views" editorial policy. A survey conducted in the early 1990s found that 68 percent of ministers in the Churches of Christ read the Chronicle, and 88 percent of those readers said they agreed with the content. The Encyclopedia of the Stone-Campbell Movement describes the Chronicle as "by far the most-read paper in the Churches of Christ and [it] exercises an influence for cohesiveness in this part of the Stone-Campbell Movement".

History
The Christian Chronicle was established in 1943, and has been characterized as "one of the most important sources of primary historical information on the worldwide missions carried out by Churches of Christ." The paper was acquired by Sweet Publishing Company in the late 1960s. In 1981 the Chronicle was redesigned by Charlie Marler, a journalism professor from Abilene Christian University. It has been supported since 1981 by Oklahoma Christian University.

References

External links
The Christian Chronicle

Christian newspapers
Churches of Christ
Newspapers published in Oklahoma City
Newspapers established in 1943
Restoration Movement